Ranjan Pai (born 11 November 1972) is an Indian medical doctor, businessperson and the chairman of the Manipal Education and Medical Group (MEMG), which runs six universities and twenty eight hospitals across the globe.

Early life and education
Ranjan Pai was born to Ramdas Pai who is a Padma Bhushan awardee 2011 and chancellor of the Manipal Academy of Higher Education (MAHE). His grandfather, T. M. A. Pai (Tonse Madhava Ananth Pai), set up the Kasturba Medical College, the country’s first private, self-financed medical college in 1953.

Pai completed his graduation from Kasturba Medical College, Manipal and his fellowship in Hospital Administration in the United States

Career
Ranjan Pai began his career as the managing director of the Melaka Manipal Medical College in Malaysia. He initially planned to continue with the family’s not-for-profit education trust, Manipal Academy of Higher Education (MAHE), but later changed his mind and joined MEMG’s business. He started MEMG in the year 2000 out of a rented house in Bengaluru with a capital of $200,000. Now the entity is valued at around $3 billion.

References

Medical doctors from Karnataka
Indian businesspeople
Indian medical doctors
Living people
1972 births